The European Azerbaijan Society was an NGO founded in 2008 which was known for promoting the business and culture of Azerbaijan, together with increasing knowledge of the humanitarian issues emanating from the Karabakh issue, across Europe.

History 
In 2006, Tale Heydarov, the son of Azerbaijani minister of emergency situations Kamaladdin Heydarov, established the London Azerbaijan Society. In 2008, the group was named The European Azerbaijan Society (TEAS).

Initially, the society had two directors – Nijat Heydarov and Tale Heydarov. They were in this position from 2008 until May 2013. From that date to present, the society's director and company secretary has been Lionel David Zetter. Shahin Namati-Nasab was the company secretary from 2008 to 2011. From 2011 to 2013 this position was occupied by Nijat Heydarov. In 2013, the first corporate secretary showed up on the stage – Legis Secretarial Services Limited. In 2014, it was replaced by Nsm Services Limited.

References

External links
 Official website of TEAS
 Official website of Visions of Azerbaijan Magazine

Foreign relations of Azerbaijan
Lobbying organisations in the United Kingdom